Grace Crompton (born 30 October 2001) is an English rugby union player.

An attendee of Epsom College and the University of Bath, Crompton scored two tries on her England debut, and six in the tournament as a whole, as England ultimately won gold in the HSBC Sevens Women’s Fast Four competition held in Vancouver, Canada, in her first international competition in September 2021.

Crompton was selected to play for England at the 2022 Commonwealth Games in rugby sevens. She was named in the England squad for the 2022 Rugby World Cup Sevens – Women's tournament held in Cape Town, South Africa in September 2022.

Personal life
Crompton is the step granddaughter of singer Michael Ball.

References

 

2001 births
Living people
Female rugby union players
England women's international rugby union players
English female rugby union players